The 1999 World Taekwondo Championships were the 14th edition of the World Taekwondo Championships, and were held in Butterdome, University of Alberta in Edmonton, Canada from June 2 to June 6, 1999, with 550 athletes participating from 66 countries.

Medal summary

Men

Women

Medal table

Team ranking

Men

Women

References

WTF Medal Winners
Official Results

World
World Taekwondo Championships
World Taekwondo Championships
Taekwondo Championships
Taekwondo in Canada